Jamaica competed at the 2014 Summer Youth Olympics, in Nanjing, China from 16 August to 28 August 2014.

Athletics

Jamaica qualified 15 athletes.

Qualification Legend: Q=Final A (medal); qB=Final B (non-medal); qC=Final C (non-medal); qD=Final D (non-medal); qE=Final E (non-medal)

Boys
Track & road events

Field Events

Girls
Track & road events

Field events

Beach Volleyball

Jamaica qualified a boys' team by winning the NORCECA CAZOVA Zone Qualifier.

Fencing

Jamaica qualified one athlete based on its performance at the 2014 FIE Cadet World Championships.

Girls

Mixed Team

Swimming

Jamaica qualified two swimmers.

Boys

References

2014 in Jamaican sport
Nations at the 2014 Summer Youth Olympics
Jamaica at the Youth Olympics